Kathryn Beaumont Levine (born 27 June 1938) is a British-American former actress, singer and school teacher. She is best known for voicing Alice in Alice in Wonderland (1951) and Wendy Darling in Peter Pan (1953), for which she was named a Disney Legend in 1998.

Early life 
Kathryn Beaumont was born to Evelyn and Kenneth Beaumont in London on 27 June 1938. Her mother was a professional dancer, while her father was a singer.

Career 
Beaumont made her feature film debut in  It Happened One Sunday (1944), which drew interest from Metro-Goldwyn-Mayer, who offered her a contract. She recalled: "MGM was planning to have films with British characters and British-type stories. However, as ideas come and go, they must have shelved the idea because they brought me over and put me under contract, then nothing happened." In spite of this, she did play small parts in MGM's On an Island with You (1948), where she did a Jimmy Durante impression in front of Durante's character, The Secret Garden (1949) and Challenge to Lassie (1949).

After Beaumont had relocated to Los Angeles, Walt Disney Pictures began auditioning young British actresses to portray Alice in their animated version of Alice in Wonderland (1951). Beaumont auditioned and received the role, working under voice director Winston Hibler. Disney subsequently cast her in the voice role of Wendy Darling in their following feature, Peter Pan (1953). In addition to providing her voice, Beaumont also served as the performance model for both characters for live-action reference to help the animators. When performing as Wendy, Beaumont was suspended in the air to simulate flight, although Beaumont had a fear of heights. Walt Disney personally cast Beaumont after seeing the film, On an Island with You. Beaumont reprised her voice acting role as Alice in two episodes of the animated series Disney's House of Mouse (2001–2003) and as both Alice and Wendy in the 2002 video game Kingdom Hearts. In 1998, Beaumont was awarded a Disney Legend award for her voice work on the films Alice in Wonderland and Peter Pan.

In 2005, Beaumont retired from acting; the roles of Alice and Wendy were taken over by Hynden Walch. She made a brief return to voice acting in 2010 when she voiced Kairi's grandmother in Kingdom Hearts Birth by Sleep.

Personal life 
After completing Peter Pan, Beaumont graduated from high school and enrolled at the University of Southern California, where she graduated with a degree in education. Upon graduating from college, Beaumont worked as an elementary school teacher in Los Angeles for 36 years.

Beaumont has been married to her husband, Allan Levine, since 1985.

As of 2023, she is the last surviving cast member of It Happened One Sunday (1944) and Alice in Wonderland (1951).

Filmography

Film

Television

Video games

Awards and nominations

References

External links 
 
 

1938 births
Living people
20th-century English actresses
21st-century English actresses
Actresses from London
Audiobook narrators
Disney people
English voice actresses
English child actresses
English child singers
English women singers
English film actresses
English television actresses
English video game actresses
RCA Victor artists
Schoolteachers from California
Metro-Goldwyn-Mayer contract players
University of Southern California alumni
British emigrants to the United States
Disney Legends